The 2004 Barbarians end of season tour was a series of matches played in May–June 2004 in Scotland, Wales, England and Portugal by Barbarian F.C.

For the first time, the "Baa-baas", played against Portugal, the winners of the 2003–04 European Nations Cup First Division.

Results

References

2004
2004 rugby union tours
2004–05 in Scottish rugby union
2004–05 in Welsh rugby union
2004–05 in English rugby union
rugby union
May 2004 sports events in the United Kingdom
June 2004 sports events in Europe